A protoplast, from ancient Greek  (prōtóplastos, "first-formed"), in a religious context initially referred to the first human or, more generally, to the first organized body of progenitors of mankind (as in Manu and  Shatrupa or Adam and Eve), or of surviving humanity after a cataclysm (as in Deucalion or Noah).

List of protoplasts

Abrahamic mythology
 Adam and Eve
 Noah
 Adam Kadmon (esoteric)
 Adam kasia ("hidden Adam") and Adam pagria ("bodily Adam") (esoteric), in Mandaeism
 Lilith (esoteric)

Australian Aboriginal mythology
 Wurugag and Waramurungundi
 Yhi
 Kidili

Ayyavazhi mythology
 Kaliyan and Kalicchi

Aztec mythology
 Tata/Coxcox and Nana/Xochitl - new progenitors of humankind after the flood
 Oxomoco and Cipactonal - first human couple created

Baganda
Kintu

Cherokee
 Selu & Kanati

Chinese folk religion
 Fu Xi & Nüwa (sometimes said to be created by Pangu)
 Pangu 

Cowichan peoples
 Quiltumtun

Germanic mythology
 Tuiscon - first ancestor of Germans

Greek mythology
 Pandora - first woman
 Epimetheus - first Man (by some Accounts) 
 Deucalion and Pyrrha (the first postdiluvian humans)

Hinduism
 Svayambhuva Manu and Shatarupa (first couple on earth)  
 Including Vaivasvata Manu and Shraddha (wife of Vaivasvata Manu) of current Manvantara

Inca mythology
 Pacha Camac

Lakota people
 Tokahe - first human emerged from the underworld
 Wa and Ka

Maori mythology
 Tiki and Marikoriko

Muisca mythology
 Tena and Fura

Navajo mythology
 Áłtsé Hastiin and Áłtsé Asdzą́ą́

Norse mythology
 Ask and Embla (former)
 Líf and Lífþrasir (future)

Polynesian mythology
 Ele'ele
 Kumu-Honua and Lalo-Honua
 Marikoriko and Tiki
 Tu-Mea
 Tonga
 Vatea and Papa

Philippine mythology
 Malakas (strong) and Maganda (beautiful)
 Silalac and Sivacay (Hiligaynon)

Shinto
 Izanagi
 Izanami

Traditional African religions
Kikuyu
Gikuyu and Mumbi
Serer creation myth
YAAB and YOP (first human couple (female and male respectively) created by Roog in Serer religion)
Unan and Ngoor (two mythical figures in the Serer creation myth and early ancestors of humanity - female and male respectively)
Jambooñ and Agaire (two sisters and early ancestors of the Serer and Jola people respectively whose pirogue broke at the Point of Sangomar separating the two groups)

Yoruba mythology
Oduduwa and Obatala
Iya Nla

Turkic mythology
 Törüngey and Ece

Zoroastrianism
 Keyumars
 Mahabad
 Mashya and Mashyana

See also
 Cosmic Man
 Discovery of human antiquity
 Eponymous ancestor
 Mitochondrial Eve
 Y-chromosome Adam

References

Creation myths
Legendary progenitors